Alhaji Moijueh Emmanuel Kaikai is a Sierra Leonean politician and the Sierra Leone Minister of Social Welfare, Gender and Children's Affairs since 2013. He had previously served as the resident Minister of the Southern Province, and Deputy Minister of Labour.

KaiKai was one of the founding members of the People's Movement for Democratic Change (PMDC) political party in 2005, a breakaway faction of the Sierra Leone People's Party (SLPP). He later switched to the All People's Congress (APC).

Moijueh KaiKai is native of Pujehun District in Southern Sierra Leone. He is a devout muslim and a member of the Mende ethnic group.

Early life and political career
Moijeh Kaikai was born and raised in Pujehun District in the Southern Province of Sierra Leone to ethnic Mende parents.

KaiKai was one of the founding members of the People's Movement for Democratic Change (PMDC) polital party led by Charles Margai in 2005, a breakaway faction of the Sierra Leone People's Party (SLPP). He later switched to the All People's Congress (APC).

KaiKai served as Sierra Leone Deputy Minister Labour and Employment from February 27, 2009, to  December 3, 2010, in the government of Sierra Leone's President Ernest Bai Koroma. He was moved to Resident Minister of the Southern Province from December 3, 2010, to January 4, 2013. He was appointed Minister of  Social Welfare, Gender and Children's Affairs On January 4, 2013, by Sierra Leone's president, Ernest Bai Koroma.

References

External links
Thepatrioticvanguard.com
Africayoungvoices.com
Salonemonitor.net
Awoko.org

Living people
All People's Congress politicians
Sierra Leonean Muslims
Mende people
People from Pujehun District
Year of birth missing (living people)